Austin Lane Poole, FBA (6 December 1889 – 22 February 1963) was a British mediaevalist.

Poole came from an academic lineage, being the son of Reginald Lane Poole (archive keeper at the University of Oxford), the nephew of Stanley Lane Poole (professor of Arabic at Trinity College Dublin), and the great-nephew of Reginald Stuart Poole (professor of archaeology at Cambridge University).

Austin Poole studied at Magdalen College School and Corpus Christi College, Oxford. He later taught at Selwyn College, Cambridge and St John's College, Oxford. He became a Fellow and subsequently President of the latter and was also a Fellow of Corpus Christi College.

During the First World War, Poole served as a lieutenant in the Gloucestershire Regiment.

Austin Poole contributed the third volume of the Oxford History of England, From Domesday Book to Magna Carta 1087–1216, published 1951. He also edited collections of poetry by Thomas Gray. He delivered the Ford Lectures in 1944.

Poole was a tutor in modern history at St John's College, Oxford from 1913 and from 14 February 1947 to 1957 was the President of the college.

References

External links

 Who's who: Austin Lane Poole

1889 births
1963 deaths
People educated at Magdalen College School, Oxford
Alumni of Corpus Christi College, Oxford
Fellows of St John's College, Oxford
Presidents of St John's College, Oxford
Fellows of Corpus Christi College, Oxford
Gloucestershire Regiment officers
20th-century British historians
Fellows of the British Academy